Torres del Río is a town and municipality located in the province and autonomous community of Navarre, northern Spain.

This town is located by the Linares River opposite Sansol. It is known for its Templar octagonal Romanesque church, formally related to those of Segovia (la Veracruz) and Eunate. The town was conquered from the Muslim occupation in 914 AD and belonged to the Monastery of Irache for several centuries before the citizens of the town bought the monastery out in the 14th century.) It is along The French Way of the Camino de Santiago.

References

External links

 TORRES DEL RIO in the Bernardo Estornés Lasa - Auñamendi Encyclopedia (Euskomedia Fundazioa) 
 Torres del Rio.- Medieval History of Navarre

Municipalities in Navarre